Sea foam is a type of foam that appears in bodies of salt water. It can also refer to:

Honeycomb toffee, a type of candy
A shade of the color green
A literal translation of "meerschaum"
Hugh "Seafoam" McDuck, a Disney character who is an ancestor of Scrooge McDuck and Donald Duck
An engine additive added to oil or gasoline